The Province of Bumbunga was an Australian secessionist micronation located on a farm at Bumbunga near Snowtown and Lochiel, South Australia, from 1976 until approximately 2000.  Its founder and only ruler was a British monkey trainer, uranium prospector, and postmaster named Alec Brackstone.

In November 1975 the Australian Labor Party government of Prime Minister Gough Whitlam was dismissed under controversial circumstances by Governor-General John Kerr, the official governmental representative of Queen Elizabeth II.  Brackstone, an ardent British monarchist, became alarmed by what he saw as a drift away from the Australian system of constitutional monarchy toward outright republicanism.   To ensure that at least a portion of the Australian continent would always remain loyal to the British Crown, he declared his four-hectare property northeast of Adelaide to be the independent Province of Bumbunga on 29 March 1976, and appointed himself its "governor-general".

Brackstone then set about attracting tourism by planting thousands of strawberry plants in the pattern of a huge scale model of Great Britain. He intended to conduct weddings on his property, during which soil from the appropriate British county would be sprinkled on the ground.  Implementation was delayed when Australian customs authorities seized the soil Brackstone had imported from the UK, and the entire enterprise was scuttled when the strawberry fields perished during a drought.

In 1980 Bumbunga began issuing cinderella stamps portraying members of the British royal family (except Sarah Ferguson, whom Brackstone disliked).  Later issues addressed anti-nuclear sentiments and other social causes while retaining the royal theme.  Though worthless as postage, they became popular with philatelists and oddity collectors.  Fifteen series of 5000 copies each were eventually produced.

In 1987 changes to Australian investment laws that reduced the attraction of philatelic investments led Brackstone to abandon his commercial operations, and Bumbunga slid into relative oblivion.  In 1999 Brackstone was arrested and charged with possession of illegal firearms.  His assertion of diplomatic immunity due to his status as Bumbunga's sovereign was unsuccessful but, according to Brackstone, the charges were ultimately dropped nevertheless. In 2018 Brackstone was interviewed at his residence in Clare, South Australia, still claiming to be Governor of the province.

References

External links
Stamps of Bumbunga

Micronations in Australia
Geography of South Australia
States and territories established in 1976
Former unrecognized countries
Micronations